Yowah is an outback town and locality in the Shire of Paroo, Queensland, Australia.

The town is known for its opal mining and numerous opal fields that lie around the town as well as the "Yowah Nut" a local type of opal distinctive to the region.

Geography 

Access to Yowah is via a bitumen road.

History 
The area was first leased in 1883 to prospective settlers and opal mining has been the central operation within the district since the first opal fields were discovered.
In the  Yowah had a population of 142.

Yowah State School opened on 22 January 1998. It was one of the smallest state primary schools in Queensland; in 2012, there were three students. The school closed in 2017 due to a lack of students. It was at 5 Harlequin Drive. Its website has been archived.

In August 2014, the town committee built two artesian spas.

Facilities 
Paroo Shire Council operates the Rural Transaction Centre which accommodates a tourist information centre, a public library, cafe, internet and tourist information.

There is also a caravan park and general store which sells groceries and fuel and has an ATM. 

There is a public hall and flying doctor rooms with the Doctors attending every Friday. Craft group, indoor bowls and meals /Bar two nights a week.

The town is serviced by the State Emergency Service and the Rural Fire Service. There are  two airfield runways which are lit at night. 

There are no pumping or storage facilities in the town and the town relies on natural artesian pressure for its water supply. Surplus artesian water discharges into a bore drain. There are no standby facilities for Yowah and if the bore fails there would be a need to transport water from one of the other water supplies in the town for the duration of the problem. The water quality has been deemed to be safe, chemically.

Events 

Yowah opal festival is a regular festival to promote and celebrate opal mining in the area.

Attractions 

Yowah has a free fossicking area (fossicking licence available at the general store). 

There is a heritage trail in which to explore the surrounding localities.

There is also a free camping area, with amenities. 

Artesian spas is a community run facility which offers two geothermally heated baths at 57°C (134.6°F). The Great Artesian Basin sources the spas and the only communal source of drinking water.

References

External links
Paroo Shire Council - Official website
Queensland Places – Queensland Places
Paroo Shire Information – Paroo Shire Information

Towns in Queensland
Mining towns in Queensland
Shire of Paroo
Localities in Queensland